Achaikos Kyrix was a newspaper that was founded in 1840 in Patras, Greece.

See also 
List of newspapers in Greece

References 
''This article is translated and is based from the article at the Greek Wikipedia (el:Main Page).

Greek-language newspapers
Newspapers published in Patras
Newspapers established in 1840
1840 establishments in Greece
Weekly newspapers published in Greece